Miloš Stepandić (born 21 October 1990) is a Serbian football goalkeeper who last played for OFK Bačka.

References

External links
 
 
 

1990 births
Living people
Sportspeople from Šabac
Association football goalkeepers
Serbian footballers
FK Mačva Šabac players
FK Rad players
FK Zemun players
OFK Bačka players
Serbian First League players
Serbian SuperLiga players